Aghdam District is one of the 66 administrative divisions of Azerbaijan. It is located in the west of the country and belongs to the Karabakh Economic Region. The district borders the districts of Khojaly, Kalbajar, Tartar, Khojavend, Aghjabadi, and Barda. Its capital is de jure Aghdam, though the current de facto capital is Quzanlı. As of 2020, the district had a nominal population of 204,000.

Most of the territory of the district was under the occupation by Armenian forces following the First Nagorno-Karabakh War in the early 1990s. However, as part of the 2020 Nagorno-Karabakh ceasefire agreement which ended the 2020 Nagorno-Karabakh War, the city of Agdam and the surrounding district were returned to Azerbaijani control on 20 November 2020.

History 
There are different opinions about the origin of the name Aghdam. According to some sources, the word "Ağdam" means "white castle" in old Turkish. According to this version, Turkic-speaking tribes living in this region in the distant past built small fortresses mainly to defend themselves. Over time, the meaning of the name of the city changed. In the first half of the 18th century, the founder of the Karabakh khanate, Panahali khan, ordered that a white stone building be built for him in this city. For a long time this building became a kind of icon for the inhabitants of the surrounding villages. In this sense, "Aghdam" means a white house illuminated by the sun's rays. Aghdam was founded in the middle of the 18th century. It was the site of Panah Ali khan Javanshir's summer palace and Javanshir family burial ground. In 1828, it received city status in Shusha Uyezd of Elisabethpol Governorate. During the Soviet era, Aghdam had many industries such as butter, wine, brandy and silk factories, as well as hardware and tool factories. An airport and two train stations served there. In terms of education, Agdam had technical, agricultural, medical and music schools.

At its 16 July 1924 session, the commission reviewed the dispute between Agdam Uyezd and AONK over Khonashen area. From the earliest times, Azerbaijani villages of Khojalan, Khojaly, Mughany existed in this area. All of them were razed to the ground during the massacre, and their dwellers fled for their life. The lands were subsequently taken over by Armenians from other villages that had nothing to do with Khonashen. The commission, however, chose not to elaborate on these "fine details", and gave the area away to AONK. It was occupied by Armenian forces with the support of the Armenian Armed Forces on 23 July 1993, and the settlement was completely destroyed and the population of the city was allowed to migrate to the east, into Azerbaijan.

Today, Agdam, located in the buffer zone between the Armenian and Azerbaijani forces, looks like a ghost town. It was founded in the 18th century and received city status in 1928. It is 365 km away from Baku . In accordance with the ceasefire agreement signed between Azerbaijan and Armenia on 10 November 2020, the entire Aghdam District passed under the control of Azerbaijan on 20 November 2020. According to the 2008 census, its population is 39,900 people.

Population 
108,554 people lived in the district in 1979. Population rose to 131,293 in 1989, of whom 28,000 lived in the town of Aghdam and over 103,000 in villages and other rural areas.

Following Aghdam's capture following Battle of Aghdam, all of Azerbaijani residents in Armenian-occupied areas were forced to flee. According to the Azerbaijani census of 2009, the nominal population of the district was 175,400.

Internally displaced people 
Internally displaced people from Nagorno-Karabakh and surrounding occupied regions were moved to Aghdam district from tent settlements around the country. They live in new houses built by the government.

References

External links 
Report by Célia Chauffour on Aghdam for Caucaz.com
HRW report on the conflict

 
Districts of Azerbaijan
Closed cities